Patrick Kenneth Abbott (2 February 1889 – 21 January 1973) was an Australian rules footballer of the 1910s who played with South Melbourne, Fitzroy, and Richmond in the Victorian Football League (VFL).

References

Sources
Holmesby, Russell & Main, Jim (2007). The Encyclopedia of AFL Footballers, 7th ed. Melbourne: Bas Publishing, 

Sydney Swans players
Fitzroy Football Club players
Richmond Football Club players
1889 births
1973 deaths
Albury Football Club players
Australian rules footballers from Albury